Frank Chesterton was a male badminton player from England.

Chesterton won the All England Open Badminton Championships, considered the unofficial World Badminton Championships, in men's singles in 1909, 1910 and 1912. He was a member of the Ealing Badminton Club.

He missed many years of potential success due to World War I but did reappear at the 1920 All England Badminton Championships where he reached the men's doubles semi final with Sir George Thomas losing to eventual winners Archibald Engelbach and Raoul du Roveray 15–6, 17–15. This tournament appears to be the last he played in with no records showing further involvement in the sport.

References

John Arlott (Hrsg.): The Oxford companion to sports & games. Oxford University Press, London 1975
All England champions 1899-2007

English male badminton players
Year of death missing
Year of birth missing